Thomas de Lechlade was Dean of Exeter between 1307 and 1309.

Notes

Deans of Exeter